The following is a list of official merchandise relating to the television series Little Britain.

Merchandise

Audiobooks
Little Britain: Radio Collection, 3 November 2003, *
Little Britain: Radio Series 1, 6 September 2004, * 
Little Britain: Radio Series 2, 4 October 2004, * 
Little Britain: On Radio, 7 November 2005, 
Little Britain: Best of TV Series 1, 3 October 2005, 
Little Britain: Best of TV Series 2, 3 October 2005, 
Little Britain: Best of TV Series 3, 1 May 2006, 
Inside Little Britain, 5 November 2007,

Music
(I'm Gonna Be) 500 Miles [CD single], 19 March 2007, ASIN B000NJLQRE
(I'm Gonna Be) 500 Miles [DVD Single], 19 March 2007, ASIN B000NJLQRO
Little Britain Presents: I'm Gay, 1 November 2007, ASIN B000NQR7HU

VHS
Little Britain: The Complete First Series, 11 October 2004, BBCV 7577

DVDs
Little Britain: The Complete First Series, 11 October 2004, BBCDVD1494
Little Britain: The Complete First Series [Limited Edition], 11 October 2004, BBCDVD1494A
Little Britain: The Complete Second Series, 10 October 2005, BBCDVD1675
Little Britain: The Complete First & Second Series, 14 November 2005, BBCDVD1864
Little Britain: The Comic Relief Special, 12 March 2005, HMVRND05
Little Britain: The Complete Third Series, 11 September 2006, BBCDVD1919
Little Britain: The Game, 6 November 2006 
Little Britain: The Complete Series, 13 November 2006, BBCDVD2101
Little Britain: Live, 13 November 2006
Little Britain: Live [Limited Edition], 13 November 2006
Little Britain: Comic Relief Does Little Britain Live, 13 March 2007
Little Britain: The Only Game in the Village, 12 November 2007
Little Britain: Abroad, 19 November 2007
Little Britain: The Complete Collection, 19 November 2007
Little Britain USA: Series 1, 24 November 2008

Books
Little Britain: The Complete Scripts and Stuff: Series One: 2004: HarperCollins: 
Little Britain: The Complete Scripts and Stuff: Series Two: 2005: HarperCollins: 
Little Britain: The Complete Scripts and Stuff: Series Three: 2006: HarperCollins: Inside Little Britain [Hardback]: Ebury: 2006: Reading Little Britain: IB Taurus: 2006:  Little Britain: The Official Diary: Danilo: 2006:  Little Britain: Yeah, But, No, But: The Biography: John Blake: 2006: Inside Little Britain [Paperback]: Ebury: 2007: 

GamesLittle Britain: The Video Game: Available on PC, PSP and PlayStation 2Little Britain: Top Trumps: Winning Moves, 2005Little Britain: 500 Piece Jigsaw: Ravensburger, 2007Little Britain: The Game: A DVD game

Talking dolls / keyrings

Little Britain Fancy Dress Costumes
Official outfits are made by a company called Smiffy's and have been on sale since 2006.
 Daffyd Thomas
 Vicky Pollard
 Lou Todd
 Andy Pipkin
 Bubbles DeVere
 Desiree DeVere
 Marjorie Dawes
 Emily Howard (discontinued)
 Florence Rose (discontinued'')

References

Little Britain
Merchandise